Astara (also romanized as Āstārā)  is a city and capital of Astara County, Gilan Province, Iran. It lies on the border with Azerbaijan Republic and on the Caspian Sea.  It is an important border trade center between Iran and the Caucasus.

History 
The earliest mention, under the name Astārāb, comes in the Ḥodūd al-ʿālam, written toward the end of the 10th century. In the 14th century, Astara became the seat of the small principality of the Esfahbad or Espahbad (-bod) of Gīlān. From the 16th to the 18th centuries, the Ṭālešī Khans of Āstārā were either autonomous or nominally subordinate to the governors of Gīlān or Ardabīl; on several occasions they played important parts in the history of the Caspian provinces. According to Minorsky, We do not know whether the later governors of Astara still continued the line of the ispahbads. Even after the conquest of Northern Tālish by the Russians (1813) the family of the Tālish-khans maintained some special rights.

Astara was part of the short lived Talysh Khanate in the 18th and 19th centuries, and for a short while it was the capital of the Khanate before it was moved to Lankaran. In 1828, with the signing of the Treaty of Turkmenchay, Astara was split into two. The city of Astara in Azerbaijan is located just across the Astarachay River.

Tourism 
Astara has various attractions and is considered a major tourist destination for Iranians and foreigners, especially those from the Caucasus. The city has a selection of beaches and is near to a Temperate rainforest. Annually over six million Iranians, and six hundred thousand foreigners visit the city. The most popular beaches in this city are Shariati park and sadaf beach. Shariati beach park is located in the city, and Sadaf beach is 7 kilometers far from Astara city

Culture  
Astara is home to one of the first libraries established in the country.

Agriculture 

Rice has been cultivated in this region for many years, where some indigenous cultivars (landrace) were conventionally bred by farmers.

Climate
Astara has a humid subtropical climate (Köppen: Cfa, Trewartha: Cf), with relatively cold, wet winters and warm, humid summers.

Language 
Linguistic composition of the city.

Famous people from Astara 
 Fereydun Ebrahimi – Procurator-General in Azerbaijan People's Government
 Ebrahim Nabavi – Iranian journalist
 Payan Rafat – football player
 Kamal Habibollahi – last Commander of the Imperial Iranian Navy
 Babak Fathi - Mechanical Engineer & University professor

Education
 Islamic Azad University of Astara

See also

 Astara, Azerbaijan
 Astarachay
 Kazi Magomed–Astara–Abadan pipeline

References

External links 

 Astara entry in the Encyclopædia Iranica
 

 
Populated places in Astara County
Cities in Gilan Province
Azerbaijan–Iran border crossings
Populated places on the Caspian Sea
Port cities and towns in Iran
Populated coastal places in Iran
Ports and harbours of Iran
Port cities and towns of the Caspian Sea
Divided cities
Azerbaijani settlements in Gilan Province